Michele Regonaschi (Brescia, 21 January 2000) is an Italian rugby union player.
His usual position is as a Wing. He plays for Calvisano in Top12 since 2019.

References

External links
It's Rugby England Profile
All Rugby Profile
ESPN Profile
Ultimate Rugby Profile

2000 births
Rugby Calvisano players
Living people
Rugby union wings